Joseph Allison was a South African (Boer) politician, born in the Cape Colony. In 1851 he was clerk to the British Resident and the Legislative Council of the Orange River Sovereignty. After the territory gained independence as Orange Free State Allison became a member of the Volksraad, government secretary (1862 – 1863) and treasurer, and briefly Acting State President of the Orange Free State in 1863, after President Pretorius had left the State. Allison had strong British sympathies.

References

Notes

Literature
 

State Presidents of the Orange Free State
Year of birth missing
Year of death missing